A market area is a geographic zone containing the people who are likely to purchase a firm's goods or services.

See also
 GIS
 Media market

References

Market (economics)